Frederick Dundas (14 June 1802 – 26 October 1872) was a British politician.

Background
Dundas was the son of the Hon. Charles Dundas, Member of Parliament for Malton, younger son of Thomas Dundas, 1st Baron Dundas. His mother was Lady Caroline, daughter of Aubrey Beauclerk, 5th Duke of St Albans.

Political career
Dundas was returned to Parliament for Orkney and Shetland in 1837, a seat he held until 1847 and again between 1852 and 1872.

Family
Dundas married Grace, daughter of Sir Ralph Gore, 7th Baronet, on 2 June 1847. She died on 15 January 1868. Dundas survived her by four years and died on 26 October 1872, aged 70.

References

External links 
 

1802 births
1872 deaths
Scottish Liberal Party MPs
UK MPs 1837–1841
UK MPs 1841–1847
UK MPs 1852–1857
UK MPs 1857–1859
UK MPs 1859–1865
UK MPs 1865–1868
UK MPs 1868–1874
Members of the Parliament of the United Kingdom for Orkney and Shetland